The 2013 Siberia Cup was a professional tennis tournament played on hard courts. It was the first edition of the tournament which was part of the 2013 ATP Challenger Tour. It took place in Tyumen, Russia between 18 and 24 November 2013.

Singles main-draw entrants

Seeds

 1 Rankings are as of November 11, 2013.

Other entrants
The following players received wildcards into the singles main draw:
  Richard Muzaev
  Dmitri Perevoshchikov
  Stanislav Vovk
  Robert Ziganshin

The following players received entry from the qualifying draw:
  Anton Galkin
  Denis Matsukevich
  Valery Rudnev
  Dzmitry Zhyrmont

Champions

Singles

 Andrey Golubev def.  Andrey Kuznetsov, 6–4, 6–3

Doubles

 Sergey Betov /  Aliaksandr Bury def.  Ivan Anikanov /  Ante Pavić, 6–4, 6–2

External links
Official Website

Siberia Cup
Siberia Cup
Siberia Cup
November 2013 sports events in Russia